The  were a baseball team in the Shikoku-Kyūshū Island League of Japan. The team was established as part of the expansion of the league (along with the Nagasaki Saints). They started league play during the  season, lasting through the 2009 season.

The team's home was Fukuoka Prefecture. Its name combined the color of the prefecture's symbol flower, the ume, and the prefectural bird, the Japanese bush-warbler.

External links
Nikkan Sports article  
Nishinippon article
IBLJ page (not yet public as of February 5, 2008)
IBLJ press release
Yomiuri Shimbun article

Baseball teams in Japan
Baseball teams established in 2008
2008 establishments in Japan
Sports teams in Fukuoka Prefecture